< List of placenames in the Province of Pomerania < List of towns in Farther Pomerania

The List of towns in Farther Pomerania includes towns that lost their town status over time as well as towns which lie west of the Oder river, but east of the Oder–Neisse line (Stettiner Zipfel area), and thus historically are associated rather with Hither Pomerania (Western Pomerania). The list also includes towns merged into the Province of Pomerania as late as 1938 and thus might not be regarded historically belonging to Farther Pomerania either.

See also 
 List of towns in Vorpommern

Literature 
 Fritz R. Barran: Städte-Atlas Pommern. 2. Auflage. Rautenberg, Würzburg 2005, .
 Peter Johanek, Franz-Joseph Post (Hrsg.): Städtebuch Hinterpommern. Verlag Kohlhammer, Stuttgart 2003.

Pomerania
Pomerania-related lists
Lists of places in Poland
Lists of places in Germany